The Lead Shoes  is a 1949 experimental film  directed by Sidney Peterson at Workshop 20 at the San Francisco Art Institute. The film was made using distorting lenses. The film is a 17 minute black and white short.

In 2009, the film was selected for the National Film Registry by the Library of Congress as being deemed “culturally, historically or aesthetically” significant. It appears on the DVD Avant-Garde Volume 3 (Experimental Cinema 1922-1954).

References

External links
The Lead Shoes  essay by Kyle Westphal on the National Film Registry website 
The Lead Shoes at Dailymotion
The Lead Shoes at IMDB
The Lead Shoes at Ways of Seeing
The Lead Shoes essay by Daniel Eagan in America's Film Legacy, 2009-2010: A Viewer's Guide to the 50 Landmark Movies Added To The National Film Registry in 2009-10, Bloomsbury Publishing USA, 2011,  pages 88–91 

1949 films
American avant-garde and experimental films
United States National Film Registry films
American black-and-white films
1940s American films